XXS - Extra Extra Small is a television, physical and family game show created by Endemol Argentina and aired in many countries around the world, where contestants perform other everyday chores in a house built for a giant.
The first episode was broadcast in Turkey 2008. It is recorded at Endemol's filming facility in Benavídez, 35 kilometres (22 mi) south of Buenos Aires, Argentina.

Rules 
Three pint-sized families vie for cash prizes by seeing who can successfully complete a series of physical challenges. The game is played in a house where everything is 100 times bigger than the contestants, a world in which everything found in the average home is suddenly enormous, even the most commonplace household task is dangerous, the families must complete the course in the quickest time in order to win the prize.

In the show four timed rounds: a children's round, a mother's round, a father's round, and a family round.The show pits families in competitions set in an oversized house that makes them look like mice, climbing giant sofas, inching across rolling pins over vats of chocolate milk and swimming through obstacles in a pool-sized washing machine. The challenges may sound simple at first, like turning off a hairdryer, closing a water tap, dodge toy soldier bullets, cross a mountain high sneaker, battle treacherous hurricane winds in an effort to turn off a household fan, or finding a pin in a bowl of pasta, but when faced with gargantuan objects, contestants must find strength, speed, and creativity to succeed. In the final round, the fate of each family is left up to the fathers. Each dad is submerged into a giant washing machine where he must hold on as long as he can while the increasing centrifugal force of the washing machine tests his strength. As velocity increases, soap and water are released and the fathers must avoid being thrown out with the clothes.

And as if that weren't enough, for every challenge that a family previously lost, a five-kilo weight is strapped to the dad's body. The family whose father holds on the longest wins the game.

International versions

References

External links
XXS page on Endemol website

Television series by Endemol
Argentine game shows
Chilean game shows
Chinese game shows
German game shows
Spanish game shows
Turkish game shows
2008 Turkish television series debuts